Liparis hostifolia is a species of flowering plant in the family Orchidaceae, native to the Bonin Islands and the Volcano Islands, both belonging to Japan.

References

hostifolia
Flora of the Volcano Islands
Flora of the Bonin Islands
Plants described in 1916